Magnus B. Egerstedt (born June 28, 1971) is a Swedish-American roboticist who is the Dean of the Henry Samueli School of Engineering at the University of California, Irvine. He was formerly the Steve C. Chaddick School Chair and Professor at the School of Electrical and Computer Engineering, Georgia Institute of Technology.

Egerstedt is a major contributor to the theory of hybrid and discrete event systems, and in particular, the control of multi-agent systems.

Biography

Education
Magnus Egerstedt was born in Täby Municipality, Stockholm, Sweden in 1971. He received his B.A. from Stockholm University in Theoretical Philosophy in 1996, specializing in language philosophy and with a thesis titled Implicit Knowledge and Public Mathematical Meaning, while simultaneously attending the Royal Institute of Technology, where he received in 1996 an M.S. in engineering physics. During this period, Egerstedt visited Texas Tech University in Lubbock, Texas, and completed his M.S. thesis A Model of the Combined Planar Motion of the Human Head and Eye. In 2000, Egerstedt completed a Ph.D. in applied mathematics under the advisement of Xiaoming Hu and Anders Lindquist for the thesis Motion Planning and Control of Mobile Robots. At KTH, Egerstedt was affiliated with (and the first graduate from) the Center for Autonomous Systems.

Career
In 1998, Egerstedt was a visiting scholar at the Robotics Laboratory at the University of California, Berkeley, where he collaborated with Shankar S. Sastry on the hybrid control of mobile robotics. From 2000 to 2001, he was a postdoctoral fellow under Roger W. Brockett at the School of Engineering and Applied Sciences, Harvard University, focusing on formal methods for robot control.

Egerstedt joined the Georgia Institute of Technology as a faculty member in the School of Electrical and Computer Engineering in 2001, where he has held the positions of Schlumberger Professor (2013–2016), Julian T. Hightower Chair in Systems and Controls (2016–2018), and Associate Chair for Research (2014–2016). In August 2018, he was appointed as the Steve W. Chaddick School Chair of the School of Electrical and Computer Engineering. Egerstedt is also holds adjunct appointments in the School of Interactive Computing, the Guggenheim School of Aerospace Engineering, and the Woodruff School of Mechanical Engineering at the Georgia Institute of Technology.

In 2016, Egerstedt was named the Executive Director of the Institute for Robotics and Intelligent Machines, a position he held for two years. In 2017, Egerstedt launched the Robotarium, a swarm-robotic research testbed whose goal is to provide access to a state-of-the-art test facility to researchers around the globe.

Starting in July 2021, Egerstedt will join the University of California, Irvine, where he will become the Dean of the Henry Samueli School of Engineering.

Professional activities

 Program Chair, IEEE Conference on Decision and Control, Miami, FL, Dec. 2018.
 Deputy editor-in-chief, IEEE Transactions on Control of Networked Systems, 2013 – 2016.
 General Chair, ADHS: Analysis and Dynamics of Hybrid Systems, Atlanta, GA, Oct. 2015.
 Senior editor, Journal of Nonlinear Analysis: Hybrid Systems, 2014 – 2016.
 Editor, Electronic Publications – IEEE Control Systems Society, 2009 – 2012.
 Associate editor, IEEE Transactions on Automatic Control, 2007 – 2011.
 Associate editor, IEEE Robotics and Automation Magazine, 2006 – 2008.
 General Chair, Hybrid Systems: Computation and Control, St Louis, MO, Apr. 2008.

Honors and awards
Egerstedt has earned a number of teaching and research awards and honors during his career:

 CAREER award from the U.S. National Science Foundation in 2003 for the project Linguistic Control of Mobile Robots.
 Outstanding Junior Faculty Member Award, School of Electrical and Computer Engineering, Georgia Institute of Technology, 2005.
 Fellow of the IEEE (Controls Systems & Robotics and Automation Societies), 2012.
 Distinguished Lecturer, IEEE Control Systems Society (2013–2015).
 Royal Institute of Technology Alumnus of the Year, 2013.
 Georgia Tech Outstanding Doctoral Thesis Advisor Award, 2015.
 John R. Ragazzini Education Award, American Automatic Control Council, 2015.
 IEEE International Conference on Robotics and Automation, Best Multi-Robot Systems Paper Award, 2017.
Foreign Member of the Royal Swedish Academy of Engineering Sciences, 2019

The School of Electrical and Computer Engineering at the Georgia Institute of Technology 
The School of Electrical and Computer Engineering (ECE) at the Georgia Institute of Technology is one of the largest producers of electrical engineers and computer engineers in the United States. Over 2,600 students are enrolled in the School’s graduate and undergraduate programs. All ECE undergraduate and graduate programs are in the top five of the most recent college rankings by U.S. News & World Report. In addition to the main campus in Atlanta, Georgia, ECE also has permanent operations at Georgia Tech-Lorraine in France and Georgia Tech-Shenzhen in China.

The Robotarium 
The Robotarium is a remotely accessible swarm robotics testbed designed and developed by Magnus Egerstedt at Georgia Tech. The Robotarium provides researchers working on swarm robotics access to both ground and aerial robots. Since its launch in August 2017, over 200 research groups from all continents except Antarctica have used the Robotarium.

Georgia Robotics and Intelligent Systems (GRITS) Lab 

At Georgia Tech, Magnus Egerstedt is the director of the Georgia Robotics and Intelligent Systems (GRITS) Lab. The research topics of the lab include:

Swarm robotics: formation control, flocking and swarming algorithms and applications of swarm robotics.
Autonomous robots: learning and path-planning for both structured indoor and unstructured outdoor environments.
 Networked control systems: producing systems with provable global properties from local interaction and communication rules.
Hybrid systems: optimal control, observers and observability, and specification languages for hybrid systems.

Publications 
Egerstedt has authored over 400 research papers in the areas of robotics and control, including the books:
 2008, M. Egerstedt and B. Mishra, (editors). Hybrid Systems: Computation and Control. Proceedings of the 11th International Workshop (St. Louis), HSCC 2008, Lecture Notes in Computer Science Series, Springer, April 2008. 680 pp. .
 2010, Egerstedt, Magnus; Mesbahi, Mehran Graph Theoretic Methods in Multiagent Networks. New Jersey: Princeton University Press; July 2010. 424 pp. .

Trivia
Egerstedt has an Erdős number of 3: Magnus B. Egerstedt – Vincent D. Blondel – Harold S. Shapiro – Paul Erdős

References

External links 
 Home Page
ECE Profile
 Mathematics Genealogy Project profile
GRITS lab

1971 births
Control theorists
Swedish emigrants to the United States
Harvard Fellows
University of California, Berkeley staff
Georgia Tech faculty
Living people
Swedish roboticists
American roboticists
Harvard School of Engineering and Applied Sciences alumni
20th-century Swedish scientists
21st-century Swedish scientists